The Broken Jaw is a short animated film by Chris Shepherd produced in 1997 by Polkadot Productions for Channel 4.

Sources
 https://www.imdb.com/title/tt0209948/

1997 films
1990s animated short films
1997 directorial debut films